The Stolen Play is a 1917 silent film directed by Harry Harvey from a script by the Horkheimer brothers for their Balboa Amusement Producing Company (aka Falcon Features).

Plot 
A blind playwright is engaged to his assistant, and the two are close to completion of a new play, which is so dark and morbid that they find themselves on the brink of breakdowns. A greedy agent who has admired the playwright's previous work will stop at nothing to secure the play for himself.

Cast 

 Ruth Roland as Sylvia Smalley
 Ed Brady as Leroux
 William Conklin as Charles Edmay
 Makoto Inokuchi as Togo

References 

1917 films
American black-and-white films